Pablo González Couñago (born 9 August 1979) is a Spanish former footballer who played as a striker.

After having played 35 La Liga matches for Celta and Málaga, scoring three goals (75 games and 11 goals both major levels of Spanish football combined), he spent the bulk of his professional career in England with Ipswich Town, where he managed 65 official goals. He also competed in Vietnam, Hong Kong and Finland.

Couñago represented Spain in the 1999 World Youth Championship, winning the tournament.

Club career

Early career
Born in Redondela, Province of Pontevedra, Galicia, and a product of local RC Celta de Vigo's youth academy, Couñago made his professional debut in Segunda División, loaned to CD Numancia, but returned in January 1999 to his first club, failing to appear in La Liga in his first spell.

In 1999–2000, he returned to the second level yet on loan, now with Recreativo de Huelva, after which he returned to Vigo still with no impact (all of his league appearances were made from the bench).

Ipswich Town
After impressing in a Spain under-21 4–0 win over England at Birmingham City's ground, Couñago was signed by Ipswich Town in the late spring of 2001, as manager George Burley had been in the stands watching his performance. The player, who was out of contract, signed a four-year deal.

Couñago made his debut for Ipswich as a substitute on the opening day of the 2001–02 Premier League season against Sunderland. He struggled for regular game time during his first season at Ipswich, only making one league start and making 12 substitute appearances in the league, making a total of 19 appearances in all competitions.

Despite a slow start to his Ipswich career, Couñago found his goal scoring form following the club's relegation to the First Division. He scored his first goals for Ipswich on 18 August 2002, netting a brace in a 6–1 home win over Leicester City at Portman Road. On 29 August, he scored a hat-trick against FC Avenir Beggen in the 2002–03 UEFA Cup, in an 8–1 home thrashing, 9–1 on aggregate over two ties.
Couñago finished the season as Ipswich's top goalscorer for the 2002–03 season with 21 goals in all competitions. His performances over the course of the season earned him the Players' Player of the Year award for the 2002–03 season.

He continued to feature regularly during the following season, scoring his first goal of the season in a 4–1 home win against Wimbledon on 20 September. Couñago managed to get in to double figures for goals for the second season running during the 2003–04 season, scoring 12 goals in 33 appearances, helping Ipswich reach the First Division play-offs after a 5th-placed finish.

Couñago did not feature as regularly during the 2004–05 season due to the form of first-choice strike partnership Darren Bent and Shefki Kuqi. He scored 3 goals in 4 league starts and 15 substitute appearances in the league as Ipswich finished 3rd in the First Division, before losing out in the play-off semi-finals to West Ham United for the second season in a row.

Málaga
Couñago joined Málaga CF in 2005–06, scoring three times in 27 matches as the Andalusians finished bottom of the table. He produced more in the following year, but the club failed to regain its top flight status.

Return to Ipswich Town
After being released by Málaga, Couñago re-signed for Ipswich on a two-year deal on 13 July 2007, extendable to three if the club gained promotion. Ipswich manager Jim Magilton said of the player: "I have always looked at Pablo as a player with all the attributes to be top class. He enjoyed a good relationship with the fans of this club, but I don't think anyone really saw the best of Pablo in his first spell here". The player stated: "It's great to be back here at Ipswich. I'm really excited about the move. As soon as I knew that Jim wanted me I was keen to come back. It's good to feel wanted. I also know the way Jim likes to play football, pass, pass, pass and that is good for me as well". He scored a return debut goal in the 4–1 home win against Sheffield Wednesday, and added two the following month in a home win against Coventry City. Couñago scored 12 goals in 45 appearances in all competitions following his first season after returning to Ipswich. One of those goals, an audacious backheel in a 1–3 defeat to Charlton Athletic on 8 December 2007, was voted goal of the season winner at Town's 2007–08 end of season awards night.

Couñago continued to be a key part of Ipswich's first team during the 2008–09 season. On 21 February 2009, Couñago started his 192nd league game for Ipswich and scored his 50th league goal for the club, in a 3–1 win at promotion rivals Queen Park Rangers. He once again reached double figure goals for the season, finishing the season with 11 goals in 47 appearances.

In the summer of 2009, he turned down the chance to join Swansea City following the arrival of Roy Keane as manager. He featured less regularly following Keane's arrival, making ll league starts during the 2009–10 season. In total, Couñago made 29 appearances across all competitions during the season, scoring 3 goals.

Loan to Crystal Palace
On 20 August 2010, Couñago joined Crystal Palace on a season-long loan, reuniting with former Ipswich boss George Burley. On 6 November 2010, Couñago scored his first goal for Palace, in a 1–2 loss at Middlesbrough, opening his home account on the 27th in the 1–0 win over Doncaster Rovers.

In June 2011, aged nearly 32, he was released by Ipswich Town after making over 200 appearances and scoring over 60 goals during a combined eight years at the club.

Later years
Subsequently, Couñago played five months with Đồng Tâm Long An F.C. in Vietnam, helping the club promote to the V-League during his spell. On 2 October 2012, he joined Hong Kong First Division League club Kitchee SC, for an undisclosed fee; he made his debut for his new team five days later, against Yokohama FC Hong Kong, coming on as a 62nd-minute substitute for compatriot Fernando Recio.

Couñago scored ten goals in 28 official appearances in his only season, and his 30-yard shot against Sun Pegasus FC helped the club win the Hong Kong FA Cup, while he also played a part in its quarterfinal run in the AFC Cup. In May 2014, after one year with CD Choco in Tercera División, he signed for Finland's FC Honka.

International career
Couñago was joint-top scorer and received the Golden Shoe award in the 1999 FIFA World Youth Championship, as the Spain under-20 team emerged victorious. In the following two years, he appeared and scored regularly for the under-21 side.

In December 2006, Couñago played for the Galicia unofficial team in a friendly match against Ecuador.

Personal life
Couñago's son, Iago, was born in April 2008.

Club statistics

Honours

Club
Celta
UEFA Intertoto Cup: 2000
Copa del Rey runner-up: 2000–01

Đồng Tâm Long An
V.League 2: 2012

Kitchee
Hong Kong FA Cup: 2012–13

International
Spain U20
FIFA U-20 World Cup: 1999

Individual
FIFA U-20 World Cup Golden Shoe: 1999
Ipswich Town Top Scorer: 2002–03 (21 goals)
Ipswich Town Players' Player of the Year: 2002–03
Ipswich Town Goal of the Season: 2007–08
Hong Kong FA Cup Most Valuable Player: 2012–13

References

External links

1979 births
Living people
Spanish footballers
Footballers from Redondela
Association football forwards
La Liga players
Segunda División players
Segunda División B players
Tercera División players
Celta de Vigo B players
RC Celta de Vigo players
CD Numancia players
Recreativo de Huelva players
Málaga CF players
Premier League players
English Football League players
Ipswich Town F.C. players
Crystal Palace F.C. players
Hong Kong First Division League players
Kitchee SC players
Veikkausliiga players
Ykkönen players
FC Honka players
PK-35 Vantaa (men) players
Spain youth international footballers
Spain under-21 international footballers
Spanish expatriate footballers
Expatriate footballers in England
Expatriate footballers in Vietnam
Expatriate footballers in Hong Kong
Expatriate footballers in Finland
Spanish expatriate sportspeople in England
Spanish expatriate sportspeople in Vietnam
Spanish expatriate sportspeople in Hong Kong
Spanish expatriate sportspeople in Finland